Jenson Kendrick (born 3 February 2001) is an English snooker player. He turned professional at the start of the 2022/2023 season. He earned a two-year tour card after defeating Hayden Pinhey 4-1 in the final round of Q School 2022 – Event 3.

Career

2022/2023 season
At the first ranking tournament, the Championship League, Kendrick played two draws, losing only one match and finishing 3rd in his round robin group. However, at all three following ranking events he lost in the qualification round.

Performance and rankings timeline

References 

English snooker players
Living people
2001 births